"Cochranella" xanthocheridia is a species of frog in the family Centrolenidae. It has an uncertain generic placement (incertae sedis ) within subfamily Centroleninae; molecular data are not available and morphological and behavioural characters do not unambiguously
place it in any specific genus.

Cochranella xanthocheridia is endemic to Colombia and known from the Cordillera Occidental in the Córdoba, Antioquia, and Risaralda Departments at elevations of  asl.

The species' natural habitats are tropical rain forests of the Andean foothills and montane forests. It is threatened by habitat loss caused by agricultural expansion and timber extraction, and by water pollution.

References

Glass frogs
Amphibians of the Andes
Frogs of South America
Amphibians of Colombia
Endemic fauna of Colombia
Taxonomy articles created by Polbot